Herbert Gustave "Dick" Plasman (April 6, 1914 – June 23, 1981) was a professional American football player who played running back for eight seasons for the Chicago Bears and Chicago Cardinals. He is notably the last player in the NFL to play a game without a helmet.  He did so in the 1940 NFL Championship game on December 8, 1940.

References

1914 births
1981 deaths
Miami Senior High School alumni
Players of American football from Miami
Basketball players from Miami
American football running backs
Vanderbilt Commodores football players
Vanderbilt Commodores men's basketball players
Chicago Bears players
Chicago Cardinals players
Vanderbilt University alumni
American men's basketball players